Antoine Allen (born 20 December 1987) is a British documentary presenter and TV reporter, best known as a presenter and reporter for ITV News programmes, documentaries and Itv Sport.

Early life 
Antoine Allen was born in Northampton, England, to British-Caribbean parents. He attended Northampton School for Boys in Northamptonshire. As a student Allen competed in 400m hurdles at a national level and won a bronze medal for high jump at the British Athletics Championships. Allen graduated from King's College London.

Broadcasting career 
In 2022, Antoine Allen's short documentary into gun crime in Sweden, aired in ITV's current affairs show On Assignment. Allen became one of the presenters for ITV News London late show.  The same year, Allen was shortlisted for the British Journalism Award's Local Journalism of the year award and  Sports Journalists' Association Broadcast Journalist Of The Year 2021. Allen joined ITV Sport's Emirates FA Cup coverage as their match day reporter for the 21/22 season 

In 2021, Allen produced his second documentary for ITV News, highlighting positive male role models. The documentary was about boxer Lawrence Okolie's journey from being bullied at school due to being clinically obese, to becoming a WBO cruiserweight world champion boxer. 

In 2020, Allen presented Good Morning Britains regional London news and reported for ITV Lunchtime News. He had notable interviews with boxer Anthony Joshua, ICC Cricket World cup winner Eoin Morgan, Rugby World Cup winner Martin Johnson, New Zealand rugby player Jonah Lomu, Olympic Games gold medalist swimmer Rebecca Adlington, long-distance runner Mo Farah, two-time UEFA Champions League winning manager José Mourinho, and  Olympic Games gold medalist gymnast Max Whitlock. Vogue photographer Misan Harriman, including a special Black History Month interviews about his career and year covering the Black Lives Matter protests. In the same year, Allen had an exclusive interview with British boxer Anthony Yarde about the death of Yarde's father and grandmother due to COVID-19. 

|n 2019, Allen joined ITN, as a TV reporter for ITV News London. He produced and reported a documentary about footballer Chuba Akpom's unbeaten season at PAOK F.C.  Allen was named as one of the Ugo Ehiogu "Ones To Watch" by The Football Black List. 

In 2018, Allen joined Onefootball in Germany, as their football news anchorman and lead content creator. By the end of year, Allen presented his first international documentary about the history of Blackface and The Netherlands' SinterKlaas children's character Zwarte Piet aka 'Black Pete'. Allen also appeared on TalkRADIO as a co-host of the Penny Smith morning radio show.

Personal life 
Allen has written for The Guardian about racism in society and has had hundreds of thousands of views of his own blogging site Antoinespeaks.co.uk. He has no children and lives in London. In 2013, Allen set a world record for most electrical energy generated by pedalling a bicycle in one minute, after creating a remarkable 16200 joules.

References 

1987 births
Living people
Alumni of King's College London
British television presenters
People from Northampton